Robert Williams (ca. 1770January 25, 1836) was Governor of the Mississippi Territory from 1805 to 1809.

Biography
Robert Williams was born in Surry County, North Carolina. Sources vary on his birth year, with some listing 1768 or 1770 or 1773. He received a liberal private education, studied law, and became an attorney.

In 1796 Williams was elected as a Democratic-Republican to the United States House of Representatives, and he served three terms, 1797 to 1803.

In 1803 President Thomas Jefferson appointed Williams to the federal commission empowered to determine the legitimacy of land claims in the recently acquired Mississippi Territory.  In May 1805 Jefferson appointed him governor, and he served until the end of Jefferson's term in March 1809. During his term as governor, Williams became unpopular as the result of a dispute with territorial secretary Cowles Mead, with each accusing the other of having been sympathetic to Aaron Burr's alleged conspiracy.

After leaving office, Williams lived in Mississippi and North Carolina and operated plantations, also serving during the War of 1812 as adjutant general of the North Carolina militia.

After the 1814 death of his wife in Washington, Mississippi, Williams moved to a plantation near Monroe, Louisiana, which he called Bon Aire.  He operated Bon Aire until his death in Ouachita Parish, Louisiana, on January 25, 1836.  He was buried at Bon Aire, but the exact location of the grave is not known.  It is the present-day site of the Baptist Children's Home and Sellers Baptist Maternity Home in Monroe.

Robert Williams' brother Lewis served as a Congressman from North Carolina, and his brother John served in the United States Senate from Tennessee. His cousin Marmaduke Williams also represented North Carolina in the U.S. House.

References

External links

18th-century births
1836 deaths
People from Surry County, North Carolina
People from Washington, Mississippi
People from Ouachita Parish, Louisiana
Mississippi Democratic-Republicans
Democratic-Republican Party members of the United States House of Representatives from North Carolina
Governors of Mississippi Territory
American militiamen in the War of 1812
American militia generals
Burials in Louisiana

de:Robert Williams (Politiker)